Jayme Stone is a Canadian banjoist, composer and producer who makes music inspired by sounds from around the world. His solo album The Utmost won the 2008 Juno Award for Instrumental Album of the Year.

Stone has studied with Béla Fleck's teacher, Tony Trischka, among others.

Stone traveled to Mali in 2007 to learn about the banjo's African roots,

Discography 
 2007: The Utmost
 2008: Africa to Appalachia (with Mansa Sissoko)
 2010: Room of Wonders
 2013: The Other Side of the Air
 2015: Jayme Stone's Lomax Project (collaborative project with Tim O'Brien, Bruce Molsky, Margaret Glaspy, Moira Smiley, Brittany Haas, Julian Lage and others)
 2017: Jayme Stone's Folklife
 2020: AWake

Awards 

 2008 Juno Award for The Utmost
 2009 Juno Award for Africa to Appalachia
 2009 Canadian Folk Music Award for Africa to Appalachia
 2011 Canadian Folk Music Award for Room of Wonders
 2014 Canadian Folk Music Award for The Other Side of the Air

Producing 

 2010 Grant Gordy—Grant Gordy
 2011 Kyle James Hauser—Oh Oh
 2011 Jake Schepps—An Evening in the Village: The Music of Béla Bartok
 2013 Kyle James Hauser—You A Thousand Times
 2015 John Bullard—The Perfect Southern Art
 2016 Carrie Newcomer—The Beautiful Not Yet
 2019 Sumaia Jackson—Möbius:Trip

References

External links 
 Jayme Stone official site

Year of birth missing (living people)
Living people
Canadian jazz composers
Male jazz composers
Canadian folk musicians
Jazz banjoists
Juno Award for Instrumental Album of the Year winners
Canadian banjoists
Juno Award for Global Music Album of the Year winners
Canadian Folk Music Award winners